The Ash Shaliheen Mosque is a mosque located besides the Prime Minister's Office Complex in Bandar Seri Begawan, Brunei.

Structure

The mosque is built in the Moroccan style by Egyptian architect Abdel-Wahed El-Wakil, winner of the 2009 Driehaus Prize and part of the New Classical movement.

The mosque has a glass retractable roof for convenience of the faithful. The mosque was completed in June 2012 and can seat up to 1000 people at a time.

See also
 List of mosques in Brunei

References

2012 establishments in Brunei
Mosques completed in 2012
Mosques in Brunei
New Classical architecture
Abdel-Wahed El-Wakil buildings